Michael Collins (born 21 July 1986) is a rugby union player for the Ospreys in the Celtic League, who plays as a lock.

External links
Ospreys profile

1986 births
Living people
Ospreys (rugby union) players
Welsh rugby union players
Place of birth missing (living people)
Rugby union locks
21st-century Welsh people